Teragram may refer to:

 1012 grams, equivalent to a megatonne. See Orders of magnitude (mass)
 Teragram Corporation